Doppelgänger is a 1969 British science fiction film written by Gerry and Sylvia Anderson and Donald James, produced by the Andersons, and directed by Robert Parrish. Filmed by the Andersons' production company Century 21, it stars Roy Thinnes, Ian Hendry, Lynn Loring, Loni von Friedl and Patrick Wymark. Outside Europe, it was released as Journey to the Far Side of the Sun, the title by which it is now more commonly known. Set in the year 2069, the film concerns a joint European-NASA mission to investigate a newly discovered planet which lies directly opposite Earth on the far side of the Sun. The mission ends in disaster and the death of one of the astronauts, following which his colleague realises that the planet is a mirror image of Earth in every detail, with a parallel and duplicate timeline.

The film was the first major live-action production by the Andersons, known for their puppet television programmes such as Thunderbirds. Having originally conceived the story as a television play, they were encouraged by their employer Lew Grade to pitch the project as a feature film to Jay Kanter of Universal Pictures. Though underwhelmed by the script, Kanter greenlit the film after the Andersons hired Parrish as director. Doppelgänger was shot between July and October 1968 at Pinewood Studios and on location in England and Portugal. The relationship between Parrish and the Andersons became strained as filming progressed, while creative disagreements between Gerry Anderson and his business partner John Read, the film's director of photography, led to Read's dismissal from Century 21. In an effort to distinguish Doppelgänger from their puppet productions, the Andersons wrote adult themes into the script, although cuts were required for the film to be awarded an A certificate by the British Board of Film Censors.

Doppelgänger premiered in August 1969 in the United States and October 1969 in the United Kingdom. It performed poorly at the box office during its initial theatrical run but has since garnered a cult following. The film has received mixed reviews from critics; while the special effects and production design have been praised, some commentators have judged the parallel Earth premise to be clichéd and uninspired. Various plot devices and imagery have been viewed as pastiches of other science fiction films, such as 2001: A Space Odyssey (1968). Several members of the cast went on to appear in UFO, the Andersons' first live-action TV series, which also re-used many of the film's props.

Plot
In 2069, the European Space Exploration Council's (EUROSEC) Sun Probe discovers a planet on the same orbital path as Earth on the far side of the Sun. The findings are transmitted to a power in the East by double agent Dr Hassler. Tracing the messages to Hassler's laboratory, Security Chief Mark Neuman corners the scientist and kills him.

EUROSEC director Jason Webb convinces NASA representative David Poulson that the West must send a crewed mission to the planet before Hassler's allies in the East. NASA astronaut Colonel Glenn Ross and EUROSEC astrophysicist Dr John Kane are assigned to the mission. After undergoing training at the EUROSEC Space Centre in Portugal, Ross and Kane blast off in the spacecraft Phoenix. They go into an artificial hibernation for the outbound journey, with "Heart-Lung-Kidney" machines maintaining their vital functions. Three weeks later, Phoenix reaches the planet and Ross and Kane are revived. Scans for life prove inconclusive, so the astronauts decide to make a surface landing in their auxiliary craft, Dove. During its descent, Dove is damaged in a thunderstorm and crashes in a mountain range, seriously injuring Kane. The astronauts are picked up by a human rescue team, who tell Ross they have landed near Ulaanbaatar, Mongolia. It appears that Ross and Kane have returned to Earth, and they are flown back to the Space Centre.

Neuman and EUROSEC official Lise Hartman question Ross, who denies that he aborted the mission. Later, Kane dies of his injuries. Ross discovers that people are now driving on the wrong side of the road and that he can no longer read printed text because it is all backwards. He comes to the realisation that he is indeed on the unknown planet, a Counter-Earth where every detail is a mirror image of his Earth. Ross's wife Sharon refuses to accept his claims, but Webb is convinced when Ross demonstrates his ease in reading reflected text and Kane's post mortem examination reveals that his internal organs are on the "wrong" side of his body. Ross theorises that the two Earths are parallel and that his counterpart from this world is experiencing similar events on his Earth. Webb proposes that Ross retrieve the flight recorder from the orbiting Phoenix and return home.

EUROSEC builds a new Dove designed to be compatible with the reversed technologies of Phoenix. Modifications include the reverse-polarisation of the electrical circuits. Ross blasts off in the spacecraft, which he has named Doppelganger, and attempts to dock with Phoenix. However, the electrical systems malfunction, crippling the spacecraft, causing it to fall back towards the Space Centre. EUROSEC are unable to correct the fault and Doppelganger crashes into a parked spacecraft, killing Ross and starting a chain reaction that destroys much of the Space Centre. All records of Ross's presence on the Counter-Earth are lost in the disaster.

Years later, former EUROSEC director Jason Webb, now confined to a wheelchair and in a much diminished mental state, is admitted to a nursing home. He sees his reflection in a mirror. He rolls forward quickly, trying to touch his doppelgänger, but crashes into the mirror and dies.

Cast
Credited:

 Roy Thinnes as Colonel Glenn Ross
 Ian Hendry as Dr John Kane
 Patrick Wymark as Jason Webb
 Lynn Loring as Sharon Ross
 Loni von Friedl as Lise Hartman
 Franco De Rosa as Paulo Landi
 George Sewell as Mark Neuman
 Ed Bishop as David Poulson
 Philip Madoc as Dr Pontini
 Vladek Sheybal as Dr Beauville
 George Mikell as Clavel (Paris delegate)
 Herbert Lom as Dr Kurt Hassler

Other uncredited cast:

 Keith Alexander as Launch Controller
 Peter Burton as Medical Technician 
 Anthony Chinn as Air-Sea Rescue Crew Member
 Nicholas Courtney as Medical Technician
 Cy Grant as Dr Gordon
 Constantine Gregory as Mission Control Technician
 Annette Kerr as Nurse
 Martin King as Dove Service Technician
 Basil Moss as Monitoring Station Technician
 Norma Ronald as Pam Kirby
 John Stone as London Delegate
 Jeremy Wilkin as Launch Control Technician

Production
In the summer of 1967, during the filming of the Andersons' puppet series Captain Scarlet and the Mysterons, Jay Kanter travelled to London to set up a European production office for Universal Pictures. Kanter was open to funding promising film ideas, so Lew Grade, the Andersons' employer and financial backer, set up a meeting for Gerry Anderson to pitch a story about a hypothetical "mirror" Earth. On the inspiration for the film, Anderson said: "I thought, rather naively, what if there was another planet on the other side of the Sun, orbiting at exactly the same speed and the same size as Earth? That idea then developed into the planet being a replicated Earth and that's how it ended up, a mirrored planet".

Writing
Assisted by Tony Williamson, Anderson and his wife, Sylvia, had written a 194-page treatment long before the initial meeting with Kanter. Although they had originally planned it as a one-hour drama for Associated Television, Sylvia thought the premise "too good for a television play" and suggested developing it as a feature film instead. John Read, the Andersons' business partner, suggested the title "Doppelgänger". According to Gerry, this term "means 'a copy of oneself', and the legend goes that if you meet your doppelganger, it is the point of your death. Following that legend, clearly, I had to steer the film so that I could end it illustrating the meaning of that word". Responding to claims that the tone was overly "dark", Anderson said that he wanted the film to have an interesting premise.

Kanter was dissatisfied with the script, so Anderson hired Donald James to improve the characterisation. James's revisions included substantial changes to the parts set on the mirror Earth, essentially causing the characters of Ross and Kane to switch roles: in the original script, the Dove crash resulted in Ross being blinded; Kane survived, only for EUROSEC to declare him insane. A structural flaw in Doppelgänger caused it to burn up in the atmosphere with Kane trapped inside, and the film ended with Kane's wife, Jason Webb, and the Rosses attending Kane's funeral.

Despite James's efforts, Kanter remained unenthusiastic. However, he agreed to finance the film provided that the Andersons chose a director who met with his approval. Gerry's first choice had been Century 21 employee David Lane, who had directed the puppet films Thunderbirds Are Go (1966) and Thunderbird 6 (1968), but Kanter wanted a veteran director with mainstream experience. After several weeks of searching, the Andersons hired Robert Parrish, who had been one of the directors on Casino Royale (1967). According to Gerry, Parrish "told us he loved the script and said it would be an honour to work with us. Jay Kanter gave Bob the thumbs up and we were in business". Anderson also said that while the poor response to Casino Royale may have raised questions about Parrish's ability, Doppelgänger could not have been made without him: "It wasn't a question of, 'Will we get on with him?' or, 'Is he the right man?' He was a name director, so we signed him up immediately".

Casting
Leading the cast was Roy Thinnes as Colonel Glenn Ross of NASA. Gerry Anderson cast Thinnes after seeing his performance as David Vincent in the TV series The Invaders. In the Andersons' script, Ross's first name was Stewart and he was the first person on Mars. In a 2008 interview, Thinnes said of the film: "I thought [Doppelgänger] was an interesting premise, although now we know that there isn't another planet on the other side of the Sun, through our space exploration and telescopic abilities. But at that time it was conceivable, and it could have been scary". To reflect the script's characterisation of Ross as a heavy smoker, Thinnes went through numerous packets of cigarettes over the course of the production, to the detriment of his health. In September 1969, The Age reported that the actor would demand a non-smoking clause for his next film: "He smokes about two packets a day, but the perpetual lighting up of new cigarettes for continuity purposes was too much".

Ian Hendry was cast as Dr John Kane, a British astrophysicist and head of the Phoenix project. In his biography, Anderson recalled that Hendry "was always drinking" and was visibly intoxicated during the filming of the Dove crash sequence: "... he was pissed as a newt, and it was as much as he could do to stagger away. Despite all that, it looked exactly as it was supposed to on screen." In the original script, Kane's first name was Philip and he had a wife called Susan. Scenes deleted from the finished film showed the character pursuing a romance with EUROSEC official Lise Hartman, played by Loni von Friedl.

Ross's wife Sharon was played by Lynn Loring. The role had originally gone to Gayle Hunnicutt, who quit early in the production after falling ill. This withdrawal led to the casting of Loring, Thinnes' then wife and a star of the TV series The F.B.I. Had she remained in the role, Hunnicutt would have appeared in a nude scene, written in to distinguish Doppelgänger from the Andersons' earlier productions. In a 1968 interview in the Daily Mail, Anderson expressed a desire to change the public's perception of Century 21, saying that his company had been "typecast as makers of children's films". On rumours that the British Board of Film Censors (BBFC) would give the film an X certificate for mature content, he stated that it was Century 21's desire to "work with live artists doing subjects unsuitable for children". The finished film replaced the nude scene with milder shots showing Sharon stepping into and out of a shower. A subplot concerns the Rosses' attempts to have a child and Glenn's discovery that Sharon has been taking birth control pills. The original script described Sharon as the daughter of a United States senator and had her pursue an affair with EUROSEC public relations officer Carlo Monetti. In the finished film, this character, played by Franco De Rosa, is renamed Paulo Landi and appears only briefly; the affair is implied in one scene but not explored further. In a deleted scene, Glenn finds Paolo and Sharon in bed together at the Rosses' villa and throws them both into a swimming pool.

Patrick Wymark played Jason Webb, the director of EUROSEC. Wymark was cast for his performance as the antiheroic businessman John Wilder in the TV dramas The Plane Makers and The Power Game; he was described in publicity material as "John Wilder (2069 model)". According to Anderson, Wymark's heavy drinking caused him to slur his lines: in one scene, the actor "had to list these explanations ... and on take after take he couldn't remember that 'two' followed 'one'. We had to do it over and over again". Anderson's biographers, Simon Archer and Marcus Hearn, consider Wymark's portrayal of Webb to be the film's standout performance. The original script described Webb as a former Minister of Technology who is romantically involved with his secretary, Pam Kirby (Norma Ronald, who had played Wilder's secretary in The Plane Makers and The Power Game).

The supporting cast included George Sewell, Philip Madoc and Ed Bishop, who respectively played EUROSEC operations chief Mark Neuman (Mark Hallam in the original script), Dr Pontini, and NASA representative David Poulson. Sewell and Madoc had both appeared in The Power Game. Poulson was to have been played by Peter Dyneley, but the role was re-cast as the producers felt that Dyneley bore a strong resemblance to Wymark and that the scenes featuring both actors would cause audiences to confuse the characters of Poulson and Webb.

Filming
Filming began on 1 July 1968 at Pinewood Studios and ended on 16 October. The exterior of the EUROSEC Headquarters was represented by Neptune House in Borehamwood, Hertfordshire (now part of BBC Elstree Centre), while Heatherden Hall appeared as the old Jason Webb's nursing home. In September, the crew travelled to Albufeira, Portugal for location shooting. Shortly after their arrival in the country, Marcello Caetano succeeded the incapacitated António de Oliveira Salazar as prime minister. Parrish was concerned that this political instability might hold up the shoot, so reduced the filming schedule from one month to two weeks.

To create an illusion of a mirror Earth, the crew reversed the film negatives using a process called "flop-over". This technique spared the production considerable time and money building specially "reversed" props and sets and organising road closures to film cars driving on the "wrong" side of the road. However, it meant that scenes set on the Counter-Earth required careful planning and rehearsal with the cast and crew. It also resulted in a number of continuity errors: for example, the "Heart-Lung-Kidney" machines aboard Phoenix are first shown connected to Ross and Kane's left wrists, then their right.

The crew had difficulty creating a scene in which the EUROSEC board hold an international videoconference on high-resolution viewing monitors. Due to the high cost of colour TV at the time of production and the need to avoid black and white to reflect the film's futuristic setting, instead of using real viewing monitors the crew cut screen-sized gaps in a wall and positioned the actors playing the conference delegates behind them. Silver paper was added to reflect the studio lights and simulate a high-resolution image, with altered eyelines creating the illusion that each delegate is looking into a camera. Archer and Hearn praise this scene as an example of how Anderson "proved once again that his productions were ahead of their time".

As filming progressed, Anderson and Parrish came into conflict. Anderson said that Kanter was brought in more than once to mediate between them: "[Sylvia and I] both knew how important the picture was to our careers, and we both desperately wanted to be in the big time". At one point, Parrish refused to film a number of scenes, saying that he would only end up deleting them. According to Anderson, when he reminded Parrish of his contractual obligations, the director loudly announced to the cast and crew: "Hell, you heard the producer. If I don't shoot these scenes which I don't really want, don't need and will cut out anyway, I'll be in breach of contract. So what we'll do is shoot those scenes next!" In his biography, Anderson stated that his one regret about the film "[was] that I hired Bob Parrish in the first place". Sylvia later described Parrish's direction as "uninspired. We had a lot of trouble getting what we wanted from him".

Parrish also clashed with Thinnes over the actor's refusal to have his hair cut a certain way for the scenes set on the Counter-Earth. Thinnes, whose hair had already been repeatedly styled, later decided that this was merely Parrish's way of asserting authority, having received a letter from a friend warning him that Thinnes could be difficult to work with. Anderson said that his own relationship with Thinnes was awkward, but that he liked the actor's performance.

Other scenes led to disagreements within Century 21. For a scene depicting Lise Hartman (Loni von Friedl) taking a shower, cinematographer John Read did the lighting in silhouette as instructed by Parrish. Gerry Anderson, who had intended the scene to show Friedl nude, demanded a reshoot, insisting that Read honour his obligations not just to Parrish as director, but also to him as producer. According to Sylvia, "Gerry was very keen to show that he was part of the 'Swinging Sixties' and felt that seeing a detailed nude shot – as he visualised it – was more 'with it' than the more subdued version".

Another dispute arose when Read filmed shots of the Phoenix spacecraft model using a hand-held camera. In his biography, Anderson recalled: "I knew enough about space travel to know that in a vacuum a spacecraft will travel as straight as a die ... [Parrish] told me that people were not familiar with space travel and therefore they would expect to see this kind of movement". Read refused to reshoot the scenes, stating that Parrish's instructions took precedence over Anderson's, and resigned from both the film and Century 21 at the request of fellow company directors the Andersons and Reg Hill. Anderson elaborated: "Clearly, John was in a difficult position. I do now understand how he must have felt, but in my heart I feel he couldn't play a double role".

Effects

The film's special effects were produced at Century 21 Studios on the Slough Trading Estate under the direction of Derek Meddings. More than 200 effects shots were filmed. The design of the Phoenix spacecraft was based on the Saturn V rocket. During filming, the  scale model unexpectedly caught fire and had to be completely rebuilt. For realism, the launch sequence was shot in the car park against the actual sky.

Although Century 21 built a full-sized Dove module in Slough, they were prevented from using it at Pinewood due to an agreement those studios had with the National Association of Theatrical Television and Kine Employees that all props featured in Pinewood productions were to be made in-house. The module was destroyed, and although Pinewood carpenters built a replacement, Anderson considered it inferior to the original.

Commenting on the film's effects, Martin Anderson of Den of Geek describes the Phoenix command module as "beautifully ergonomic without losing too much NASA-ness" and the Dove lander as "a beautiful fusion of JPL gloss with classic lines". He regards the Phoenix launch as Meddings' finest work prior to Moonraker (1979). Archer and Hearn describe the sequence as "one of the most spectacular" of its kind produced by Century 21.

Postproduction
Composer Barry Gray, who wrote the music for all of Century 21's productions, said that his score for Doppelgänger was his favourite. The score was recorded over three studio sessions held between 27 and 29 March 1969. The first session used a 55-member orchestra, the second 44, and the third 28. The sequence showing Ross and Kane's journey to the Counter-Earth was accompanied by a piece titled "Sleeping Astronauts", featuring an ondes Martenot played by French ondiste Sylvette Allart. Archer and Hearn describe this piece as "one of the most enchanting" ever written by Gray, adding that the soundtrack as a whole evoked a "traditional Hollywood feel" which contrasted with the film's futuristic setting.

The title sequence, set inside Dr Hassler's laboratory, was accompanied by a spy theme. This took its inspiration from the character's use of an ocular prosthesis containing a hidden micro-camera to carry out his undercover activities. Archer and Hearn regard this as a stylistic imitation of James Bond films.

Theatrical release

Universal were unimpressed by the finished film, causing its release to be delayed by a year. British distributors The Rank Organisation were similarly underwhelmed. On 26 March 1969, the BBFC passed Doppelgänger with an A certificate, which allowed children under 11 to see the film provided that they were accompanied by a parent or guardian. To secure this rating, cuts to shots of contraceptive pills were required. Rank enquired whether the film could be cut further to secure a U certificate, removing the need for parental supervision; the BBFC rejected the idea, stating that this would cause the film to lose all narrative sense.

After premiering in the US on 27 August 1969, the film had its UK opening at the Odeon Leicester Square in London on 8 October. In Odeon cinemas, it was screened as half of a double feature with Death of a Gunfighter, ultimately running for less than a week. A second round of US screenings began in Detroit on 1 November. The overall box office response was poor.

The film was distributed by Rank in Europe and Universal in the US and Australia. While Rank kept the original title, Universal, which judged that non-Europeans would be less familiar with the term "doppelganger", renamed the film "Journey to the Far Side of the Sun"the title by which it is now more commonly known. Gerry Anderson biographers Archer and Stan Nicholls argue that while this title provides a clearer explanation of the plot, it lacks the "intrigue and even poetic quality of Doppelgänger".

Two original 35 mm prints of the film are known to exist. One is kept by the British Film Institute; the other by Fanderson, the official Gerry Anderson fan club. While original prints give top billing to Ian Hendry, Universal's Journey to the... format credits Thinnes first. Some British prints feature an alternative version of the final scene with a short voice-over from Ross, repeating a line of dialogue the character says to Webb earlier in the film: "Jason, we were right. There are definitely two identical planets."

Some TV broadcasts of the film have shown an incorrectly flopped picture. This originated from a mistake made in the 1980s when an original print was being transferred to videotape: a telecine operator who was unfamiliar with the film believed that the Counter-Earth scenes had been flopped in error and therefore made a second flop to reverse this. This de-flopped picture, which became the standard for all TV showings, changed the plot of the film: if shown in this format, the film makes it appear that the Ross of the Counter-Earth has landed on the "normal" Earth.

Reception
Since its original release, Doppelgänger has received a mixed response from commentators. Archer and Nicholls consider it a cult film.

Contemporary reviews

Writing for The Times, critic John Russell Taylor praised Doppelgänger as "quite ingenious" but suggested that the title and pre-release publicity gave away too much of the plot. In the US, Howard Thompson of The New York Times wrote that the film "never really gets off the ground" and "remains a little too civilised and restrained for its own good." He praised the "crispness" of certain dialogue, along with the visual style and Parrish's direction, but argued that the story deserved "a larger movie, at least one with more stratospheric sweep and suspense". Judith Crist of New York magazine described Doppelgänger as "a science-fiction film that comes up with a fascinating premise three-quarters of the way along and does nothing with it." She commended the film for being "nicely gadget-ridden", as well as raising questions about the conflict between science and politics, but criticised the editing. Variety magazine considered the plot confusing, equating the Dove crash to the quality of the writing: "Astronauts take a pill to induce a three-week sleep during their flight. Thereafter the script falls to pieces in as many parts as their craft."

While The Miami News and The Montreal Gazette regarded the film as better than average for its genre, the Pittsburgh Press dismissed it as "a churned out science-fiction yarn ... Let's hope there's only one movie like this one", and ranked it among the worst films of the year. The Gazette added that while the film gets worse towards the end, "until then it's a reasonably diverting futuristic melodrama." A review in the Southeast Missourian stated that "in today's space terminology [the film] almost rates as science – and pure reportage through film. Still it evolves as a fascinating motion-picture entertainment." In 1975, Jeff Rovin called Doppelgänger "confusing but colourful" and praised its "superb" effects.

Retrospective reviews
Gary Gerani, co-writer of Pumpkinhead, ranks Doppelgänger 81st in his book Top 100 Sci-Fi Movies, calling the film "enigmatic" and a "fine example of speculative fantasy in the late '60s". He praises Thinnes' and Wymark's performances, the characterisation, the film's lesser themes (which include adultery, infertility and corruption) and its "Fourth of July-style" effects. Sylvia Anderson suggested that American audiences, who were less familiar with Century 21's puppet productions than their British counterparts, were more enthusiastic about the film. She explained: "It was all too easy to compare our real actors with our puppet characters and descriptions such as 'wooden', 'expressionless', 'no strings attached' and 'puppet-like' were cheap shots some of the UK critics could not resist ... Typecasting is the lazy man's friend, and boy, were we typecast in Britain". In 1992, she said of the film: "I saw it on TV a couple of years ago and I was very pleased with it. I thought it came over quite well". To Chris Bentley, Doppelgänger is a "stylish and thought-provoking science-fiction thriller".

TV Guide magazine gives the film two stars out of four, calling it a "strange little film" with an "overwritten script". Glenn Erickson of DVD Talk considers Doppelgänger a "good" film but writes that it "takes an okay premise but does next to nothing with it. We see 100 minutes of bad drama and good special effects, and then the script opts for frustration and meaningless mystery". He criticises the cinematography, comparing it to that of Thunderbirds in so far as the characters "stand and talk a lot", while defining the script as "at least 60 percent hardware-talk and exposition ... How people move about – airplane, parachute, centrifuge – is more important than what they're doing". In a review for Den of Geek, Martin Anderson praises the direction and effects but states that the film's "robust and prosaic" dialogue sits "ill-at-ease with the metaphysical ponderings". He criticises some of the editing, noting that many of the effects shots have "that 'Hornby' factor, slowing up the narrative unnecessarily". He rates Doppelgänger three stars out of five, summing it up as "an interesting journey with many rewards".

The Film4 website gives Doppelgänger two-and-a-half stars out of five, summing it up as "an occasionally interesting failure". The review praises the effects and costume design but judges the subplots about Hassler's treachery and the Rosses' marital problems to be unnecessary distractions from the main story. It also questions the originality of the premise and the depth of the writing: "Anderson's has to be the cheapest alternate Earth ever. Whereas audiences might expect a world where the Roman Empire never fell or the Nazis won World War II, here the shocking discovery is that people write backwards. That's it". A similar view is expressed by Gary Westfahl, who describes the setting as "the most boring and unimaginative alien world imaginable".

Interpretation

Archer and Nicholls suggest as possible causes of the film's box office failure its "quirky, offbeat nature" and waning public interest in space exploration after Apollo 11. The topic of the Moon landing dominated a contemporary review in The Milwaukee Journal, which found similarities in the plot of Doppelgänger: "... the spacemen find a few bugs in their 'LM' and crash on the planet. And do they ever have their hands full in getting back to Earth!" Suggesting that the performances are hampered by an excess of technical dialogue, the review concluded: "... the makers of this space exploiter may get lots of mileage at the box office, but Neil, Buzz and Mike did it better on TV."

It has also been suggested that 2001: A Space Odyssey and Planet of the Apes, both released the year before, set a high standard for Doppelgänger and other films to follow. Erickson argues that Doppelgänger is inferior to 2001 for presenting a "working future" that is still dominated by commercialism. Comparing the visual style to that of 2001, he notes similar use of "psychedelic" images and close-ups of human eyes but calls such imitation "fluff without any deeper meaning". Film4's review describes the final scene featuring the elderly Webb as "hell-bent on recreating the enigmatic finale of 2001 by using a mirror, a wheelchair and a tartan blanket." Rovin argues that Doppelgängers effects "[occasionally] outshine" 2001s", going on to state that it "attempts to kindle a profundity similar to that of [2001] in its abstract philosophising about the dichotomy of dual worlds, but fails with a combination of meat-and-potatoes science fiction and quasi-profound themes." He argues that Doppelgänger is "neither a kid's film nor a cult film" but rules that "the elements that comprise the finished effort are more than individually successful."

Martin Anderson compares Doppelgänger to other science fiction films like Solaris, identifying a "lyrical" tone to the dialogue. However, he concedes that Doppelgänger "doesn't bear comparison with Kubrick or Tarkovsky", the directors of 2001 and Solaris. Both commentator Douglas Pratt and the Institute of Contemporary Arts in London compare the film to "The Parallel", an episode of The Twilight Zone in which an astronaut returns to Earth to find his world bizarrely changed and realises that he has ended up in a parallel universe. S. T. Joshi likens Doppelgängers theme of duplication to the premise of Invasion of the Body Snatchers, in which a race of extraterrestrials called the Pod People abduct humans and replace them with alien doubles.

Legacy
Despite the film's failure, Grade gave the Andersons further commissions with live actors. The first of these was the TV series UFO, which began airing in 1970. Doppelgänger is considered a precursor to UFO and has also been described as a "trial run" for the follow-up series, Space: 1999. Most of the cast went on to appear in UFO, notably Ed Bishop as the protagonist Colonel Ed Straker and George Sewell as his deputy, Colonel Alec Freeman. In addition, many of the film's costumes, shooting locations, and musical tracks were re-used, along with props including the Phoenix and Dove miniature models and a number of futuristic vehicles (which were modelled on Mini Mokes and Ford Zephyr Zodiacs). Neptune House appeared as the exterior of Harlington-Straker Film Studios where SHADO, the organisation headed by Colonel Straker, is based. The recycled music included the tracks "Sleeping Astronauts" and "Strange Planet", the latter accompanying the series' end credits. The opening titles imitated the teleprinter shots that formed the basis of Doppelgängers title sequence.

A retrospective by IGN argues that the presentation of politics and economics in Doppelgänger goes against the conventions of 1960s science fiction. This is reflected in UFO, whose characters "were constantly having to deal with the pressures of having to show progress under the scrutiny of accountants and elected officials, much the same way NASA was starting to in the US". On the links between Doppelgänger and UFO, Martin Anderson makes another connection to Kubrick: "... the most interesting common ground between the two projects remains the bleak ending(s) and the slight flirtation with the acid-induced imagery and mind fucks of 2001".

Home media
Previously available on LaserDisc, the film was released on Region 1 DVD in 1998 and both Region 1 and 2 DVD (digitally remastered) in 2008. Prior to the 2008 release, the BBFC re-classified the film PG for "mild violence and language".

Blu-ray versions followed in 2015. The US Blu-ray release was by Universal Entertainment. The Australian release by Madman Entertainment includes a double-sided sleeve (enabling the film to be stored under either of its titles), a transfer of Fanderson's original film print and an exclusive audio commentary by Gerry Anderson.

See also

Another Earth, a 2011 film with a similar premise
The Stranger, a 1973 TV film with a similar premise

References

Citations

General and cited references

External links
 
 
 
 
 
 

1969 films
1969 adventure films
1969 drama films
1969 thriller films
1960s adventure thriller films
1960s science fiction adventure films
1960s science fiction drama films
1960s science fiction thriller films
1960s spy films
AP Films
Adultery in films
British adventure thriller films
British science fiction drama films
British science fiction thriller films
British space adventure films
British spy films
Counter-Earths
Fiction set in 2069
Films about astronauts
Films about extraterrestrial life
Films about NASA
Films directed by Robert Parrish
Films set in the 2060s
Films set in Mongolia
Films set in Portugal
Films set on fictional planets
Films shot at Pinewood Studios
Films shot in the Algarve
Sun in film
Universal Pictures films
1960s English-language films
1960s British films